Chigang Pagoda, also known as the Red Stone Hill Pagoda  or Honam Pogoda, is a famous pagoda located in Haizhu District, Guangzhou, China.

History 
Chigang Pagoda was built in 1619, during the reign of the Wanli Emperor of the Ming dynasty, at a time when fengshui influences were pervasive in Chinese architecture. Together with the Pazhou Pagoda (Whampoa Pagoda) and Lotus Pagoda, it is said that the three pagodas were built at the mouth of the Pearl River to bring good luck to Guangzhou and the surrounding area.

The building is made from red sandstone. The style of the Chigang Pagoda is influenced by the Ming dynasty architecture of the era. It was built to mirror the Pazhou Pagoda in the vicinity as well.

Architecture
The pagoda is built in an octagonal shape. The pagoda has nine exterior floor sections. Inside the pagoda, it consist of 17 levels which keeps the nine sections together.

Restoration
Because of neglect and exposure to the elements over the centuries, the Chigang Pagoda deteriorated. The external wall cracked, the foundation started to sink, and the floors became uneven due to neglect. At one stage, the pagoda leaned about 1.05 m from the vertical.

In 1996 the Guangzhou authorities started work on its restoration, but this was never completed due to a lack of funds. In 1998 the Guangzhou Municipal Cultural Relics Management raised RMB 1.60 million to fund restoration of the Pagoda. The restoration and inspection was completed in mid-1999.

Transport 
The pagoda can be reached by rail. It is near Canton Tower Station (previously called Chigang Pagoda Station) on line 3 and Kecun Station on line 3 and line 8 of the Guangzhou Metro. However, the pagoda is not open to the public.

References 

Buddhist temples in Guangzhou
Haizhu District
Religious buildings and structures completed in 1619
Pagodas in China
1619 establishments in China